Proquazone is a nonsteroidal anti-inflammatory drug, known as an NSAID.

Synthesis

References 

Quinazolinones
Ureas